In mathematics, a metric connection is a connection in a vector bundle E equipped with a bundle metric; that is, a metric for which the inner product of any two vectors will remain the same when those vectors are parallel transported along any curve.  This is equivalent to:
 A connection for which the covariant derivatives of the metric on E vanish.
 A principal connection on the bundle of orthonormal frames of E.

A special case of a metric connection is a Riemannian connection; there is a unique such which is torsion free, the Levi-Civita connection.  In this case, the bundle E is the tangent bundle TM of a manifold, and the metric on E is induced by a Riemannian metric on M.

Another special case of a metric connection is a Yang–Mills connection, which satisfies the Yang–Mills equations of motion. Most of the machinery of defining a connection and its curvature can go through without requiring any compatibility with the bundle metric. However, once one does require compatibility, this metric connection, defines an inner product, Hodge star (which additionally needs a choice of orientation), and Laplacian, which are required to formulate the Yang–Mills equations.

Definition 
Let  be any local sections of the vector bundle E, and let X be a vector field on the base space M of the bundle. Let  define a bundle metric, that is, a metric on the vector fibers of E. Then, a connection D on E is a metric connection if:

Here d is the ordinary differential of a scalar function. The covariant derivative can be extended so that it acts as a map on E-valued differential forms on the base space:

One defines  for a function , and

The above definitions also apply to local smooth frames as well as local sections.

Metric versus dual pairing
The bundle metric  imposed on E should not be confused with the natural pairing  of a vector space and its dual, which is intrinsic to any vector bundle. The latter is a function on the bundle of endomorphisms  so that

pairs vectors with dual vectors (functionals) above each point of M.  That is, if  is any local coordinate frame on E, then one naturally obtains a dual coordinate frame  on E* satisfying .

By contrast, the bundle metric  is a function on 

giving an inner product on each vector space fiber of E. The bundle metric allows one to define an orthonormal coordinate frame by the equation  

Given a vector bundle, it is always possible to define a bundle metric on it.

Following standard practice, one can define a connection form, the Christoffel symbols and the Riemann curvature without reference to the bundle metric, using only the pairing  They will obey the usual symmetry properties; for example, the curvature tensor will be anti-symmetric in the last two indices and will satisfy the second Bianchi identity.  However, to define the Hodge star, the Laplacian, the first Bianchi identity, and the Yang–Mills functional, one needs the bundle metric.  The Hodge star additionally needs a choice of orientation, and produces the Hodge dual of its argument.

Connection form
 

Given a local bundle chart, the covariant derivative can be written in the form 

where A is the connection one-form.

A bit of notational machinery is in order.  Let  denote the space of differentiable sections on E, let  denote the space of p-forms on M, and let  be the endomorphisms on E. The covariant derivative, as defined here, is a map

One may express the connection form in terms of the connection coefficients as

The point of the notation is to distinguish the indices j, k, which run over the n dimensions of the fiber, from the index i, which runs over the m-dimensional base space.

The notation of A for the connection form comes from physics, in historical reference to the vector potential field of electromagnetism and gauge theory.

Skew symmetry
The connection is skew-symmetric in the vector-space (fiber) indices; that is, for a given vector field , the matrix  is skew-symmetric; equivalently, it is an element of the Lie algebra .

This can be seen as follows. One then has, by definition, that , so that:

In addition, for each point  of the bundle chart, the local frame is orthonormal:

It follows that, for every vector , that

That is,  is skew-symmetric.  

This is arrived at by explicitly using the bundle metric; without making use of this, and using only the pairing , one can only relate the connection form A on E to its dual A on E, as   This follows from the definition of the dual connection as

Curvature
There are several notations in use for the curvature of a connection, including a modern one using F to denote the field strength tensor, a classical one using R as the curvature tensor, and the classical notation for the Riemann curvature tensor, most of which can be extended naturally to the case of vector bundles. None of these definitions require either a metric tensor, or a bundle metric, and can be defined quite concretely without reference to these. The definitions do, however, require a clear idea of the endomorphisms of E, as described above.

Compact style
 
which is an element of

or equivalently,

To relate this to other common definitions and notations, let  be a section on E. Inserting into the above and expanding, one finds

or equivalently, dropping the section

as a terse definition.

Component style
In terms of components, let  where  is the standard one-form coordinate bases on the cotangent bundle T*M. Inserting into the above, and expanding, one obtains (using the summation convention):

Keep in mind that for an n-dimensional vector space, each  is an n×n matrix, the indices of which have been suppressed, whereas the indices i and j run over 1,...,m, with m being the dimension of the underlying manifold.  Both of these indices can be made simultaneously manifest, as shown in the next section.

The notation presented here is that which is commonly used in physics; for example, it can be immediately recognizable as the gluon field strength tensor.  For the abelian case, n=1, and the vector bundle is one-dimensional; the commutator vanishes, and the above can then be recognized as the electromagnetic tensor in more or less standard physics notation.

Relativity style
A given section  then may be written as

In this local frame, the connection form becomes

Inserting and turning the crank, one obtains

where  now identifiable as the Riemann curvature tensor. This is written in the style commonly employed in many textbooks on general relativity from the middle-20th century (with several notable exceptions, such as MTW, that pushed early on for an index-free notation). Again, the indices i and j run over the dimensions of the manifold M, while r and k run over the dimension of the fibers.

Tangent-bundle style
The above can be back-ported to the vector-field style, by writing  as the standard basis elements for the tangent bundle TM. One then defines the curvature tensor as

so that the spatial directions are re-absorbed, resulting in the notation

Alternately, the spatial directions can be made manifest, while hiding the indices, by writing the expressions in terms of vector fields X and Y on TM.  In the standard basis, X is

and likewise for Y. After a bit of plug and chug, one obtains

where

is the Lie derivative of the vector field Y with respect to X.

To recap, the curvature tensor maps fibers to fibers:

so that

To be very clear,  are alternative notations for the same thing. Observe that none of the above manipulations ever actually required the bundle metric to go through.  One can also demonstrate the second Bianchi identity

without having to make any use of the bundle metric.

Yang–Mills connection

The above development of the curvature tensor did not make any appeals to the bundle metric. That is, they did not need to assume that D or A were metric connections: simply having a connection on a vector bundle is sufficient to obtain the above forms.  All of the different notational variants follow directly only from consideration of the endomorphisms of the fibers of the bundle.

The bundle metric is required to define the Hodge star and the Hodge dual; that is needed, in turn, to define the Laplacian, and to demonstrate that

Any connection that satisfies this identity is referred to as a Yang–Mills connection. It can be shown that this connection is a critical point of the Euler–Lagrange equations applied to the Yang–Mills action

where  is the volume element, the Hodge dual of the constant 1.  Note that three different inner products are required to construct this action: the metric connection on E, an inner product on End(E), equivalent to the quadratic Casimir operator (the trace of a pair of matricies), and the Hodge dual.

Riemannian connection
An important special case of a metric connection is a Riemannian connection.  This is a connection  on the tangent bundle of a pseudo-Riemannian manifold (M, g) such that  for all vector fields X on M.  Equivalently,  is Riemannian if the parallel transport it defines preserves the metric g.

A given connection  is Riemannian if and only if 

for all vector fields X, Y and Z on M, where  denotes the derivative of the function  along this vector field .

The Levi-Civita connection is the torsion-free Riemannian connection on a manifold.  It is unique by the fundamental theorem of Riemannian geometry.  For every Riemannian connection, one may write a (unique) corresponding Levi-Civita connection. The difference between the two is given by the contorsion tensor.

In component notation, the covariant derivative  is compatible with the metric tensor  if  

Although other covariant derivatives may be defined, usually one only considers the metric-compatible one.

If the space is also torsion-free, then the tensor  is symmetric in its first two indices.

A word about notation 
It is conventional to change notation and use the nabla symbol ∇ in place of D in this setting; in other respects, these two are the same thing. That is, ∇ = D from the previous sections above.

Likewise, the inner product  on E is replaced by the metric tensor g on TM. This is consistent with historic usage, but also avoids confusion: for the general case of a vector bundle E, the underlying manifold M is not assumed to be endowed with a metric. The special case of manifolds with both a metric g on TM in addition to a bundle metric  on E leads to Kaluza–Klein theory.

See also 
 Vertical and horizontal bundles

References

 

Connection (mathematics)
Riemannian geometry